The MN55 cultivar apple developed by David Bedford, a senior researcher and research pomologist at the University of Minnesota's apple-breeding program, and James Luby, PhD, professor, Department of Horticultural Sciences, Horticultural Research Center, is a cross between Honeycrisp and MonArk (AA44), a non-patented apple variety grown in Arkansas.

Patented by the University of Minnesota, this apple variety is known botanically as “Malus Domestica”.

The MN55 cultivar apple was originally developed in 1997 through natural cross-pollination. David Bedford and the team at the University of Minnesota also developed the popular Honeycrisp apple and its successor, the SweeTango-brand Minneiska apple.

The MN55 fruit is grown and sold under the licensed brand names, Rave and First Kiss. The quality of MN55 fruit is dependent upon climate, grower sites and production practices. To insure consistency in fruit quality the University of Minnesota limits the license of MN55. Outside Minnesota, MN55 is licensed to Stemilt Growers under the Rave brand. Minnesota commercial growers grow and sell the fruit under the brand name, First Kiss.

Characteristics 
The MN55 produces early ripening fruit that are ready to pick in July. Medium to large in size, and globose-conical in shape, the apples have a crisp, juicy texture, and are similar in flavor to Honeycrisp. Its Monark parentage contributes to its quick ripening, its mostly dark red color, and long storage life.

Uses 
Rave and First Kiss apples are intended for eating. Baking is not recommended, as the flesh is so delicate it falls apart.

Development and characteristics 
 MN55 is crossbred without using genetically modified organisms (GMOs). This is a difficult task and took Bedford and Luby more than 14,000 tries.
 From crossbreeding MN55 to producing the first commercial Rave apple took 20 years. 
 MN55 fruit fall off the tree before harvesting, so need to be monitored closely.

Timeline
 1997 – First seedling tree selected at a research center located near Lake Minnetonka in Excelsior, Minnesota.
 1998 - Asexual propagation succeeds 
 2014 – United States patent PP26,412 filed
 2014 – Licensed to Stemilt Growers
 2017 – Stemilt releases Rave apple
 2018 – University of Minnesota Introduces First Kiss apple

References 

Apple cultivars with patented mutants
American apples
Apple cultivars